Elyakim-Gustav Badian (12 December 1925 – 13 February 2000) was an Israeli politician who served as a member of the Knesset for Likud between 1977 and 1981.

Biography
Born in Chernivtsi in Romania (today in Ukraine), Badian joined the Zionist Movement. He attempted to make aliyah to Mandatory Palestine, but was captured by the British authorities and sent to one of the Cyprus internment camps in 1947, where he became a member of the High Committee. In 1949 he finally made aliyah.

He studied engineering at the Technion, and was later awarded an MBA by Tel Aviv University. He worked as an engineer, and was national secretary of the Engineers Union from 1968 until 1972, and again from 1974 until 1977.

Having been a member of the leadership of the Dor Hadash faction in the General Zionists, Badian became a member of the Liberal Party when the General Zionists merged into it in 1961. He  became a member of the party's board in 1964, and was elected onto Haifa city council in 1965, serving until 1969, and again between 1972 and 1978. In 1977, he was elected to the Knesset on the Likud list (an alliance of the Liberal Party, Herut and other right-wing parties), but lost his seat in the 1981 elections.

He died in 2000 at the age of 74.

References

External links

1923 births
2000 deaths
20th-century Israeli engineers
City councillors of Haifa
General Zionists politicians
20th-century Israeli Jews
Israeli people of Romanian-Jewish descent
Jewish Israeli politicians
Liberal Party (Israel) politicians
Likud politicians
Members of the 9th Knesset (1977–1981)
Romanian emigrants to Israel
Romanian Jews in Israel
20th-century Romanian Jews
Romanian Zionists
Technion – Israel Institute of Technology alumni
Tel Aviv University alumni